Morland is a city in Graham County, Kansas, United States.  As of the 2020 census, the population of the city was 115.

History
The community was originally called Fremont when it was founded in 1884 and named after John C. Fremont. In order to avoid repetition with another Kansas community named "Fremont", the name was changed to Kalula in 1888, and was changed yet again to Morland in 1892. Morland was named for a railroad employee.

Geography
Morland is located at  (39.348828, -100.074821).

Demographics

2010 census
As of the census of 2010, there were 154 people, 77 households, and 47 families residing in the city. The racial makeup of the city was 95.5% White, 1.9% Native American, and 2.6% from two or more races.

There were 77 households, of which 20.8% had children under the age of 18 living with them, 51.9% were married couples living together, 6.5% had a female householder with no husband present, 2.6% had a male householder with no wife present, and 39.0% were non-families. 32.5% of all households were made up of individuals, and 11.7% had someone living alone who was 65 years of age or older. The average household size was 2.00 and the average family size was 2.49.

The median age in the city was 51 years. 14.9% of residents were under the age of 18; 6.4% were between the ages of 18 and 24; 13.5% were from 25 to 44; 38.2% were from 45 to 64; and 26.6% were 65 years of age or older. The gender makeup of the city was 47.4% male and 52.6% female.

2000 census
As of the census of 2000, there were 164 people, 70 households, and 48 families residing in the city. The racial makeup of the city was 98.17% White, 1.22% Native American and 0.61% Asian.

There were 70 households, out of which 25.7% had children under the age of 18 living with them, 62.9% were married couples living together, 5.7% had a female householder with no husband present, and 31.4% were non-families. 27.1% of all households were made up of individuals, and 15.7% had someone living alone who was 65 years of age or older. The average household size was 2.34 and the average family size was 2.81.

In the city, the population was spread out, with 24.4% under the age of 18, 3.0% from 18 to 24, 28.7% from 25 to 44, 26.2% from 45 to 64, and 17.7% who were 65 years of age or older. The median age was 41 years. For every 100 females, there were 97.6 males. For every 100 females age 18 and over, there were 100.0 males.

The median income for a household in the city was $32,917, and the median income for a family was $41,250. Males had a median income of $17,250 versus $21,250 for females. The per capita income for the city was $17,060. About 10.2% of families and 11.4% of the population were below the poverty line, including 19.4% of those under the age of eighteen and none of those 65 or over.

Education
The community is served by Graham County USD 281 public school district, formerly known as Hill City USD 281. It absorbed Morland USD 280 in 2002.

Morland schools were closed through school unification. The Morland High School mascot was Morland Tigers. The Morland Tigers won the Kansas State High School class 1A volleyball championship in 1974 and 1975.

References

Further reading

External links
 Morland - Directory of Public Officials
 Historic Images - Wichita State University Libraries
 Morland city map, KDOT

Cities in Kansas
Cities in Graham County, Kansas